Syedna Abduttayyeb Zakiuddin (died 2 Rabi-ul-Awwal 1041 AH/1633 AD; born 8 Safar-ul-Muzaffar 972 AH/15 September 1564 AD, Ahmedabad, India) was the 29th Da'i al-Mutlaq of the Dawoodi Bohra. He succeeded the 28th Dai, Syedna Sheikh Adam Safiuddin to the religious post.

Family
Syedna Abduttayyeb Zakiuddin was born in 1564. His father was Syedna Dawood Bin Qutubshah while his mother was Raani Aai Saheba binte Ali bin Jivabhai. He had two brothers: 32nd Dai Syedna Qutub Khan Qutubuddin, Miya Khan-ji and a sister called Habiba.

Life
It was during his tenure that a dissident sect was formed called Alavi Bohras led by Ali bin Ibrahim, grandson of Syedna Sheikh Adam Safiuddin.

Succession
Syedna Zakiuddin appointed (declared nass on) Syedna Ali Shamsuddin to be his successor.

Mausoleum
Syedna Mohammed Burhanuddin dedicated a new mausoleum in 1996. The inner walls are ornamented with verses of the Quran in Kufic script and inlaid with rubies.

References

Further reading 
Daftary, Farhad, The Ismaili, Their History and Doctrine (Chapter -Mustalian Ismailism- p. 300-310)
Lathan, Young, Religion, Learning and Science
Bacharach, Joseph W. Meri, Medieval Islamic Civilisation

Dawoodi Bohras
Dawoodi Bohra da'is
1574 births
1633 deaths
17th-century Ismailis